KFLS-FM (96.5 FM) is a radio station broadcasting a country music format. Licensed to Tulelake, California, United States.  The station is currently owned by Wynne Enterprises LLC.

References

External links

FLS-FM
Country radio stations in the United States